The pale-headed blind snake (Anilios hamatus) is a species of snake in the family Typhlopidae.

References

Anilios
Reptiles described in 1981
Snakes of Australia